Sonoma County is a county located in the U.S. state of California. As of the 2020 United States Census, its population was 488,863. Its county seat and largest city is Santa Rosa. It is to the north of Marin County and the south of Mendocino County. It is west of Napa County and Lake County.

Sonoma County comprises the Santa Rosa-Petaluma Metropolitan Statistical Area, which is part of the San Jose-San Francisco-Oakland, CA Combined Statistical Area. It is the northernmost county in the nine-county San Francisco Bay Area region.

In California's Wine Country region, which also includes Napa, Mendocino, and Lake counties, Sonoma County is the largest producer. It has thirteen approved American Viticultural Areas and more than 350 wineries. The voters have twice approved open space initiatives that have provided funding for public acquisition of natural areas, preserving forested areas, coastal habitat, and other open space. More than 8.4 million tourists visit each year, spending more than $1 billion in 2016.

In 2012, Sonoma County ranked as the 22nd county in the United States in agricultural production. By 1920, Sonoma County was ranked as the eighth most agriculturally productive U.S. county and a leading producer of hops, grapes, prunes, apples, as well as dairy and poultry products, largely due to the extent of available, fertile agricultural land in addition to the abundance of high-quality water for irrigation. As of 2009, agriculture was largely divided between two nearly monocultural uses: grapes and pasturage.

History
The Pomo, Coast Miwok and Wappo peoples were the earliest human settlers of Sonoma County, between 8000 and 5000 BC, effectively living within the natural carrying capacity of the land. Archaeological evidence of these First people includes a number of occurrences of rock carvings, especially in southern Sonoma County; these carvings often take the form of pecked curvilinear nucleated design.

Spaniards, Russians, and other Europeans claimed and settled in the county from the late 16th to mid-19th century, seeking timber, fur, and farmland. The Russians were the first newcomers to establish a permanent foothold in Sonoma County, with the Russian-American Company establishing Fort Ross on the Sonoma Coast in 1812. This settlement and its outlying Russian settlements came to include a population of several hundred Russian and Aleut settlers and a stockaded fort with artillery. However, the Russians abandoned it in 1841 and sold the fort to John Sutter, settler and Mexican land grantee of Sacramento.

The Mission San Francisco Solano, founded in 1823 as the last and northernmost of 21 California missions, is in the present City of Sonoma, at the northern end of El Camino Real. El Presidio de Sonoma, or Sonoma Barracks (part of Spain's Fourth Military District), was established in 1836 by Comandante General Mariano Guadalupe Vallejo. His duties included keeping an eye on the Russian traders at Fort Ross, secularizing the Mission, maintaining cooperation with the Native Americans of the entire region, and doling out the lands for large estates and ranches. The City of Sonoma was the site of the Bear Flag Revolt in 1846.

Sonoma was one of the original counties when California became a state in 1850, with its county seat originally the town (now city) of Sonoma. However, by the early 1850s, Sonoma had declined in importance in both commerce and population, its county buildings were crumbling, and it was relatively remote. As a result, elements in the newer, rapidly growing towns of Petaluma, Santa Rosa, and Healdsburg began vying to move the county seat to their towns. The dispute ultimately was between the bigger, richer commercial town of Petaluma and the more centrally located, growing agricultural center of Santa Rosa. The fate was decided following an election for the state legislature in which James Bennett of Santa Rosa defeated Joseph Hooker of Sonoma and introduced a bill that resulted in Santa Rosa being confirmed as county seat in 1854. Allegedly, several Santa Rosans, not caring to wait, decided to take action and, one night, rode down the Sonoma Valley to Sonoma, took the county seals and records, and brought them to Santa Rosa. Some of the county's land was annexed from Mendocino County between 1850 and 1860.

Early post-1847 settlement and development focused primarily on the city of Sonoma, then the region's sole town and a common transit and resting point in overland travel between the region and Sacramento and the gold fields to the east. However, after 1850, a settlement that soon became the city of Petaluma began to grow naturally near the farthest navigable point inland up the Petaluma River. Originally a hunting camp used to obtain game to sell in other markets, by 1854 Petaluma had grown into a bustling center of trade, taking advantage of its position on the river near a region of highly productive agricultural land that was being settled. Soon, other inland towns, notably Santa Rosa and Healdsburg began to develop similarly due to their locations along riparian areas in prime agricultural flatland. However, their development initially lagged behind Petaluma which, until the arrival of railroads in the 1860s, remained the primary commercial, transit, and break-of-bulk point for people and goods in the region. After the arrival of the San Francisco and North Pacific Railroad in 1870, Santa Rosa began to boom, soon equalling and then surpassing Petaluma as the region's population and commercial center. The railroad bypassed Petaluma for southern connections to ferries of San Francisco Bay.

Six nations have claimed Sonoma County from 1542 to the present:

Sonoma County was severely shaken by the 1906 San Francisco earthquake. The displacements along the fault averaged .

In October 2017, the county was greatly affected by the Tubbs Fire and the Nuns Fire. In late October and early November 2019, the Kincade Fire burned , almost all in Sonoma County. In August and September 2020, the Walbridge Fire burned  in the western part of the county; then in September–October the Glass fire affected the city of Santa Rosa and ultimately destroying 1,000+ buildings The county also had a wildfire in the 1870s that is compared to the Hanley fire and Tubbs fire because they burned in the same path.

The Sonoma County Landmarks Commission recognizes nearly 200 formal historical landmarks and the Sonoma County Historical Society counts 380 landmarks recognized by several agencies.

Etymology

According to the book California Place Names, "The name of the Indian tribe is mentioned in baptismal records of 1815 as Chucuines or Sonomas, by Chamisso in 1816 as Sonomi, and repeatedly in Mission records of the following years."

According to the Coast Miwok and the Pomo tribes that lived in the region, Sonoma translates as "valley of the moon" or "many moons". Their legends detail this as a land where the moon nestled, hence the names Sonoma Valley and the "Valley of the Moon." This translation was first recorded in an 1850 report by General Mariano Guadalupe Vallejo to the California Legislature. Jack London popularized it in his 1913 novel The Valley of the Moon.

In the native languages there is also a constantly recurring ending tso-noma, from tso, the earth; and noma, village; hence tsonoma, "earth village." Other sources say Sonoma comes from the Patwin tribes west of the Sacramento River, and their Wintu word for "nose". Per California Place Names, "the name is doubtless derived from a Patwin word for 'nose', which Padre Arroyo (Vocabularies, p. 22) gives as sonom (Suisun)." Spaniards may have found an Indian chief with a prominent protuberance and applied the nickname of Chief Nose to the village and the territory. The name may have applied originally to a nose-shaped geographic feature.

Jesse Sawyer argues that it is from Wappo tso-noma, meaning "redwood place."

Geography

The county lies in the North Coast Ranges of northwestern California. Its ranges include the Mayacamas and the Sonoma Mountains, the southern peak of the latter being the prominent landform Sears Point. The highest peak in the Mayacamas within the county and the highest peak in the County is Mt. Saint Helena. It has uncommon occurrences of pygmy forest, dominated by Mendocino cypress. The highest peak of the Sonoma Mountains is Sonoma Mountain itself, which boasts two significant public access properties: Jack London State Historic Park and Fairfield Osborn Preserve.

The county includes the City of Sonoma and the Sonoma Valley, in which the City of Sonoma is located. However, these are not synonymous. The City of Sonoma is merely one of nine incorporated cities in the county. The Sonoma Valley is just the southeastern portion of the county, which includes many other valleys and geographic zones, including the Petaluma Valley, the Santa Rosa Plains, the Russian River, the Alexander Valley, and the Dry Creek Valley.

Distinct habitat areas within the county include oak woodland, redwood forest, northern coastal scrub, grassland, marshland, oak savanna and riparian woodland. The California oak woodland in the upper Yulupa Creek and Spring Creek watersheds in Annadel State Park is a relatively undisturbed ecosystem with considerable biodiversity. These forested areas have been characterized as some of the best examples of such woodlands. An unusual characteristic of these forests is the high content of undisturbed prehistoric bunchgrass understory, testifying to the absence of historic grazing or other agriculture.

Trees of the oak woodland habitat include Pacific madrone, Douglas fir, coast live oak, Garry oak, and California laurel. Common understory plants are toyon, poison oak, and, at the fringes, coast silk-tassel.

Climate

Sonoma County, as is often the case with coastal counties in California, has a great degree of climatic variation and numerous, often very different, microclimates. Key determining factors for local climate are proximity to the ocean, elevation, and the presence and elevation of hills or mountains to the east and west. This is in large part due to the fact that, as throughout California, the prevailing weather systems and wind come normally from the Pacific Ocean, blowing in from the west and southwest, so that places closer to the ocean and on the windward side of higher elevations tend to receive more rain from autumn through spring and more summer wind and fog. This itself is partly a result of the presence of high and low pressures in inland California, with persistent high summer temperatures in the Central Valley, in particular, leading to low pressures, drawing in moist air from the Pacific, cooling into damp cool breezes and fog over the cold coastal water. Those places further inland and particularly in the lee of significant elevations tend to receive less rain and less, in some cases no, fog in the summer.

The coast itself is typically cool and moist throughout summer, often foggy, with fog generally blowing in during the late afternoon and evening until it clears in the later morning becoming sunny, before repeating. Coastal summer highs are typically in the mid to high 60s, warming to the low 70s further from the ocean.

Certain inland areas, including the Petaluma area and the Santa Rosa Plain, are also prone to this normal fog pattern in general. However, they tend to receive the fog later in the evening, the fog tends to be more short-lived, and mid-day temperatures are significantly higher than they are on the coast, typically in the low 80s F. This is particularly true for Petaluma, Cotati, and Rohnert Park, and, only slightly less so, Santa Rosa, Windsor, and Sebastopol. In large part, this results from lower elevations and the prominent Petaluma Gap in the hills between the ocean to the west and the Petaluma Valley and Santa Rosa Plain to the east.

Areas north of Santa Rosa and Windsor, with larger elevations to the west and further from the fog path, tend to receive less fog and less summer marine influence. This is in part due to the presence of the Sonoma Mountains between Petaluma and Sonoma. Cloverdale, far to the north and outside of the Santa Rosa Plain, is significantly hotter than any other city in the county, with rare evening-morning fog and highs often in the 90s, reaching  much more frequently than the other cities. Notably, however, the temperature differences among the different areas of the county are greatest for the highs during mid-day, with the diurnal lows much more even throughout the entire county. The lows are closely tied to the evening-morning cooling marine influence, in addition to elevation, bringing similarly cool temperatures to much of region.

These weather patterns contribute to high diurnal temperature fluctuations in much of the county. In summer, daily lows and highs are typically 30–40 °F apart inland, with highs for Petaluma, Cotati, Rohnert Park, Santa Rosa, Windsor, and Sebastopol typically being in the very low 80s F and lows at or near . Healdsburg and the City of Sonoma, with similar lows, have even greater diurnal fluctuations due to their significantly warmer highs. On the other hand, the coast, with strong marine influence, tends to have low diurnal temperature fluctuation, with summer highs much cooler than the inland towns, typically 65–75 °F, yet lows in the high 40s to low 50s F, fairly comparable to most inland towns.

These microclimates are evident during the rainy seasons as well, with great variation in the amount of rainfall throughout the county. However, certain areas, particularly in the north-west portion of the county around the Russian River, receive significantly more rainfall. The Cazadero region is the second wettest place in California after Gasquet.

Snow is exceedingly rare in Sonoma County, except in the higher elevations on and around the Mayacamas Mountains, particularly Mount Saint Helena, and Cobb Mountain, whose peak is in Lake County.

Ocean, bays, rivers and streams

Sonoma County is bounded on the west by the Pacific Ocean, and has  of coastline. The major coastal hydrographic features are Bodega Bay, the mouth of the Russian River, and the mouth of the Gualala River, at the border with Mendocino County. All of the county's beaches were listed as among the cleanest in the state in 2010.

Six of the county's nine cities, from Healdsburg south through Santa Rosa to Rohnert Park and Cotati, are in the Santa Rosa Plain. The northern Plain drains directly to the Russian River, or to a tributary; the southern Plain drains to the Russian River via the Laguna de Santa Rosa.

Russian River

Much of central and northern Sonoma County is in the watershed of the Russian River and its tributaries. The river rises in the coastal mountains of Mendocino County, north of the city of Ukiah, and flows into Lake Mendocino, a major flood control reservoir. The river flows south from the lake through Mendocino to Sonoma County, paralleled by Highway 101. It turns west at Healdsburg, receiving water from Lake Sonoma via Dry Creek, and empties into the Pacific Ocean at Jenner.

Laguna de Santa Rosa
The Laguna de Santa Rosa is the largest tributary of the Russian River. It drains a  watershed, including most of the Santa Rosa Plain.

The Laguna de Santa Rosa Foundation says:

The Laguna de Santa Rosa is Sonoma County's richest area of wildlife habitat, and the most biologically diverse region of Sonoma County (itself the second-most biologically diverse county in California)... As the receiving water of a watershed where most of the county's human population lives, it is a landscape feature of critical importance to Sonoma County's water quality, flood control, and biodiversity.

The Laguna's largest tributary is Santa Rosa Creek, which runs through Santa Rosa. Its major tributaries are Brush Creek, Mark West Creek, Matanzas Creek, Spring Creek, and Piner Creek. Santa Rosa Creek was shown to be polluted in Sonoma county first flush results.

Other water bodies
The boundary with Marin County runs from the mouth of the Estero Americano at Bodega Bay, up Americano Creek, then overland to San Antonio Creek and down the Petaluma River to its mouth at the northwest corner of San Pablo Bay, which adjoins San Francisco Bay. The southern edge of Sonoma County comprises the northern shore of San Pablo Bay between the Marin County border at the Petaluma River and the border with Solano County at Sonoma Creek. Sonoma County has no incorporated communities directly on the shore of San Pablo Bay. At the present, there is only a private marina with related facilities called Port Sonoma near the mouth of the Petaluma River. However, the Petaluma River, which flows into San Pablo Bay, is navigable up to the city of Petaluma.

The Petaluma River, Tolay Creek, and Sonoma Creek enter the bay at the county's southernmost tip. The intertidal zone where they join the bay is the vast Napa Sonoma Marsh.

Americano Creek, the Petaluma River, Tolay Creek, and Sonoma Creek are the principal streams draining the southern portion of the county. The Sonoma Valley is drained by Sonoma Creek, whose major tributaries are Yulupa Creek, Graham Creek, Calabazas Creek, Schell Creek, and Carriger Creek; Arroyo Seco Creek is tributary to Schell Creek. Other creeks include Foss, Felta, and Mill.

Lakes and reservoirs in the county include Lake Sonoma, Tolay Lake, Lake Ilsanjo, Santa Rosa Creek Reservoir, Lake Ralphine, and Fountaingrove Lake.

Marine protected areas
Like underwater parks, these marine protected areas help conserve ocean wildlife and marine ecosystems.
Del Mar Landing State Marine Reserve
Stewarts Point State Marine Reserve & Stewarts Point State Marine Conservation Area
Salt Point State Marine Conservation Area
Gerstle Cove State Marine Reserve
Russian River State Marine Reserve and Russian River State Marine Conservation Area
Bodega Head State Marine Reserve & Bodega Head State Marine Conservation Area
Estero Americano State Marine Recreational Management Area

Threatened/endangered species

A number of endangered plants and animals are found in Sonoma County, including the California clapper rail (Rallus longirostris obsoletus), salt marsh harvest mouse (Reithrodontomys raviventris), northern red-legged frog (Rana aurora), Sacramento splittail (Pogonichthys macrolepidotus), California freshwater shrimp (Syncaris pacifica), showy Indian clover (Trifolium amoenum), and Hickman's potentilla (Potentilla hickmanii).

Species of special local concern include the California tiger salamander (Ambystoma californiense) and some endangered plants, including Burke's goldfields (Lasthenia burkei), Sebastopol meadowfoam (Limnanthes vinculans), and Sonoma sunshine or Baker's stickyseed (Blennosperma bakeri).

Endangered species that are endemic to Sonoma County include Sebastopol meadowfoam, Sonoma sunshine, and Pitkin Marsh lily (Lilium pardalinum subsp. pitkinense).

The Sonoma County Water Agency has had a Fisheries Enhancement Program since 1996. Its website says:

"The primary focus of the FEP is to enhance habitat for three salmonids: Steelhead, Chinook salmon, and Coho salmon. These three species are listed as threatened under the U.S. Endangered Species Act. The California Department of Fish and Game considers the Coho salmon endangered."

Adjacent counties
Mendocino County, California – north
Lake County, California – northeast
Napa County, California – east
Solano County, California – southeast
Marin County, California – south
Contra Costa County, California – south-southeast

National protected area
 San Pablo Bay National Wildlife Refuge (part)

Transportation

Major highways
 U.S. Route 101

U.S. Route 101 is the westernmost Federal highway in the U.S.A. Running north/south through the states of California, Oregon, and Washington, it generally parallels the coastline from the Mexico–US border to the Canada–US border. Highway 101 links seven of the county's nine incorporated cities: Cloverdale, Healdsburg, Windsor, Santa Rosa, Rohnert Park, Cotati, and Petaluma. It is a freeway for its entire length within the county.

The four-lane sections of the highway have been heavily congested during peak commute hours for many years and work is being done to widen part of the highway to six lanes. The segment from north of Petaluma (at Old Redwood Highway/Petaluma Boulevard North exit) to Windsor has been fully widened, as has the segment from the Petaluma River bridge to the Marin County border. The two new inner lanes are designated for vehicles with two or more occupants during commute hours. Work is being done around Petaluma to finish the widening within Sonoma County; the widening also involves upgrading the highway to full freeway standards.

 State Route 1

Within Sonoma County, Highway 1 follows the coastline from the Mendocino County border, at the mouth of the Gualala River, to the Marin County border, at the Estero Americano (Americano Creek), southeast of Bodega Bay.

 State Route 12

Highway 12 runs eastward from its intersection with Highway 116 in Sebastopol to Santa Rosa. There it turns south through the Valley of the Moon to Sonoma, then east into Napa County. The four-lane freeway section within Santa Rosa, between Fulton Road and Farmers Lane, is called the Luther Burbank Memorial Highway. That section, especially where it crosses Highway 101, is severely congested during peak commute hours.

The two-lane Bodega Highway runs west from the intersection of Highways 12 and 116 in Sebastopol, through the coastal hills to its intersection with Highway 1, east of Bodega Bay. East of Santa Rosa, Highway 12 is also called Sonoma Highway; and east of the City of Sonoma, Carneros Highway.

 State Route 37

Highway 37 connects Highway 101 at Novato, in Marin County, with Interstate 80 in Vallejo, in Solano County, at the top of San Pablo Bay. Within Sonoma County, it is also called Sears Point Road.

 State Route 116

Highway 116 is a winding, two-lane rural route that runs from Jenner, at the mouth of the Russian River on the coast, southeast to Arnold Drive near Sonoma. It is also called Guerneville Highway, between Guerneville and Forestville; Gravenstein Highway North, between Forestville and Sebastopol; and Gravenstein Highway South, between Sebastopol and Stony Point Road, west of Rohnert Park. East of Petaluma it is called Lakeville Highway, then Stage Gulch Road.

 State Route 121

Highway 121 is a two-lane rural route running from Highway 37 near Sears Point Raceway to Highway 128 in Lake Berryessa, in Napa County.

 State Route 128

The northernmost section of Highway 128 is a two-lane, rural route running southeast from Highway 101 at Geyserville, north of Healdsburg, through the Alexander Valley and into Napa County.

Public transportation
Sonoma County Transit is the countywide transit operator, providing service to all cities in Sonoma County.
CityBus operates within the city limits of Santa Rosa.
The cities of Cloverdale and Petaluma also provide their own local bus service.
Golden Gate Transit connects Santa Rosa and points south with Marin County and San Francisco.
Mendocino Transit Authority runs north from Santa Rosa to Ukiah (via US 101) and to the coast (via California Routes 12 and 1).
Sonoma–Marin Area Rail Transit (SMART) is a commuter rail line eventually planned to go between Larkspur in Marin County and Cloverdale in Sonoma County.  the line operates between Larkspur and the Sonoma County Airport.

Airports
The Charles M. Schulz - Sonoma County Airport is at 2290 Airport Boulevard, west of Highway 101, between Santa Rosa and Windsor. It offers fuel, major maintenance, hangar space, and tie-downs for local and transient aircraft. Alaska Airlines, American Airlines, and United Airlines offer regular daily commercial flights.

There are five general aviation airports within the county: 
Cloverdale Municipal Airport
Healdsburg Municipal Airport
Petaluma Municipal Airport
Sonoma Skypark
Sonoma Valley Airport

Railroads

In 1864, the Petaluma and Haystack Railroad connected the city of Petaluma to a ferry landing at the head of navigation on the Petaluma River.

In 1870, the San Francisco and North Pacific Railroad (SF&NP) connected the City of Santa Rosa to ferry connections at Donahue landing on the Petaluma River. Rail service was extended north to Healdsburg in 1871 and Cloverdale in 1872. In 1884 the railroad was extended south to an alternate ferry connection in Tiburon. This rail line serves as the primary route of Sonoma–Marin Area Rail Transit.

The 3-foot-gauge North Pacific Coast Railroad extended northward in 1876 from a ferry connection at Sausalito through Valley Ford, Freestone, and Occidental to Monte Rio on the lower Russian River. Service was extended to Duncans Mills in 1877 and Cazadero in 1885. The standard gauge Fulton and Guerneville Railroad left the SF&NP at Fulton to reach Korbel in 1876 and Guerneville in 1877. Standard-gauge rails were extended down-river to Duncan Mills in 1909 after the Northwestern Pacific Railroad merger, and narrow-gauge service was discontinued in 1930. The standard-gauge route became River Road after tracks were removed in 1935.

The unique Sonoma Valley Prismoidal Railway linked the city of Sonoma to bay ferries in 1876 and was replaced in 1879 by the -gauge Sonoma Valley Railroad to a ferry landing near the mouth of the Petaluma River. Service was extended from Sonoma to Glen Ellen in 1882. The southern end of the line was extended westward in 1888 to a connection with the SF&NP at Ignacio. This line was converted to standard-gauge in 1890 and remains (in 2018) as Sonoma County's connection to the national rail system at Schellville.

Southern Pacific subsidiary Santa Rosa and Carquinez Railroad extended eastward in 1888 to link Santa Rosa with the national rail system. The portion between Sonoma and Santa Rosa was dismantled in the 1940s after interchange shifted to the former Sonoma Valley line.

A SF&NP branch line from Santa Rosa brought rail service to Sebastopol in 1890. The Petaluma and Santa Rosa Railroad extended interurban service north from a ferry connection in Petaluma to reach Sebastopol in 1904, Santa Rosa in 1905, and Forestville in 1906. Portions of this line were converted to the Joe Rodota Trail after tracks were removed in the 1980s.

The Sonoma–Marin Area Rail Transit commuter rail line inaugurated passenger service on August 25, 2017, utilizing the Northwestern Pacific Railroad right-of-way from Sonoma County Airport station to Larkspur Landing in Marin. The system is planned to extend to Cloverdale Depot.

Crime 

The following table includes the number of incidents reported and the rate per 1,000 persons for each type of offense in the year of 2009.

Cities by population and crime rates

Demographics

2020 census

Note: the US Census treats Hispanic/Latino as an ethnic category. This table excludes Latinos from the racial categories and assigns them to a separate category. Hispanics/Latinos can be of any race.

2011

Places by population, race, and income

2010 Census
The 2010 United States census reported that Sonoma County had a population of 483,878. The racial makeup of Sonoma County was 371,412 (76.8%) White, 7,610 (1.6%) African American, 6,489 (1.3%) Native American, 18,341 (3.8%) Asian, 1,558 (0.3%) Pacific Islander, 56,966 (11.8%) from other races, and 21,502 (4.4%) from two or more races. Hispanic or Latino of any race were 120,430 persons (24.9%).

2000
At the 2000 United States census, there were 458,614 people, 172,403 households, and 112,406 families in Sonoma County. The population density was 291/sq mi (112/km2). There were 183,153 housing units at an average density of 116/sq mi (45/km2).

Of the 172,403 households, 50.3% were married couples living together, 34.8% were non-families, and 10.4% had a female householder with no husband present. 31.9% had children under the age of 18 living with them, 25.7% were individuals, and 10.0% were 65 years of age or older living alone. The average household size was 2.60, and the average family size was 3.12.

The median age was 38 years. 24.5% were under 18, 8.8% from 18 to 24, 29.2% from 25 to 44, 24.9% from 45 to 64, and 12.6% were 65 years of age or older. For every 100 females there were 97 males. For every 100 females age 18 and over, there were 94 males.

The median household income was $53,076, and the median family income was $61,921. Males had a median income of $42,035, females $32,022. The per capita income for the county was $25,724. About 4.7% of families and 8.1% of the population were below the poverty line, including 8.4% of those under age 18 and 5.7% of those age 65 or over.

Metropolitan Statistical Area
The United States Office of Management and Budget has designated Sonoma County as the Santa Rosa-Petaluma, CA Metropolitan Statistical Area. The United States Census Bureau ranked the Santa Rosa-Petaluma, CA Metropolitan Statistical Area as the 105th most populous metropolitan statistical area of the United States as of July 1, 2012.

The Office of Management and Budget has further designated the Santa Rosa-Petaluma, CA Metropolitan Statistical Area as a component of the more extensive San Jose-San Francisco-Oakland, CA Combined Statistical Area, the 5th most populous combined statistical area and primary statistical area of the United States as of July 1, 2012.

Government
Sonoma County's governing board and legislative body is the five-member Sonoma County Board of Supervisors. Supervisors are elected by district at the Consolidated Primary Election, and serve for four years. The Supervisors also sit as directors of several local jurisdictions, such as Sonoma Water, and the Agricultural Preservation & Open Space District.

The current supervisors (as of January 2021) are:
 District 1: Susan Gorin,
 District 2: David Rabbitt,
 District 3: Chris Coursey,
 District 4: James Gore, and
 District 5: Lynda Hopkins.

The Supervisors appoint the members of 59 boards, commissions, and committees.

The County Administrator is the county's chief executive officer, reporting to the Board of Supervisors. The administrator manages the county's departments, such as the regional parks department.

On December 15, 2009, the Board announced the appointment of Veronica Ferguson to be the first woman County Administrator. She assumed office on February 1, 2010.

On May 1, 2014, the county launched a public utility named Sonoma Clean Power. This utility was created under the guidelines of Community Choice Aggregation.

State and federal representation

Law enforcement
The Sonoma County Sheriff's Department is the law enforcement agency for the unincorporated area of the county. It also contracts to provide the police forces of the City of Sonoma and the Town of Windsor. The department has more than 1,000 employees, including more than 275 Deputy Sheriffs, in four bureaus. More than 300 Correctional Officers and staff work in two jail facilities; Main Area Detention Facility and the North County Detention Facility, with a total daily population of nearly 1,200 inmates. Police shootings in 2007 led to calls for an independent civilian police review board; which was established in 2015.

Economy

Agriculture has long played a critical role in Sonoma County's economy, and it makes up a major component of California's Wine Country. Just over 2% of the population works in agriculture, nearly twice the state average. Similar to other regions of the state, the county's mild climate and fertile soil allow for the cultivation of a wide variety of crops, ornamentals, and for the raising of livestock. Beyond the production of grapes, the county's agricultural heartland is primarily located in the west and southwest, and near the cities of Petaluma and Sebastopol. The renowned horticulturalist Luther Burbank, who created hundreds of new varieties of plants and crops, lived and worked in Sonoma County for much of his life.

 Winemaking— Both the growing of the grapes and their vinting—is an important part of the economic and cultural life of Sonoma County, and by far its most valuable industry. First established in 1850 by a Franciscan priest named Fr. Jose Altimira of the Mission San Francisco Solano, the production of wine has perhaps become Sonoma County's most well known feature. In 2004, growers harvested s) of wine grapes worth US$310 million. In 2006 the Sonoma County grape harvest amounted to over 185,000 tons, exceeding Napa County's harvest by more than 30 percent. About 80 percent of non-pasture agricultural land in the county is for growing wine grapes— in 2014 of vineyards, with over 1100 growers. In 2019 Sonoma County's wine industry had produced over $654,000,000 worth of wine grapes. The most common varieties planted are Chardonnay, Sauvignon blanc, Cabernet Sauvignon, and Pinot noir, though the area is also known for its Merlot and Zinfandel. Sonoma County is home to more than 425 wineries with sixteen distinct and two shared American Viticultural Areas, including the Sonoma Valley AVA, Russian River Valley AVA, Alexander Valley AVA, Bennett Valley AVA and Dry Creek Valley AVA, the last of which is known for the production of high-quality Zinfandels.
 Dairy farming- Particularly prominent in the western reaches of the county and in the Petaluma Gap, dairy farming and milk production is another major agricultural sector in Sonoma. Worth nearly $140,000,000 in 2019, Sonoma County is home to nearly 65 registered dairies, including the locally prominent Clover Sonoma and recently the Straus Family Creamery. In addition to milk, the county is home to producers of cheese and yogurt. It was reported that in 2018, just over half of all of the county's dairies were certified as organic. 
Poultry farming and other livestock- The raising of livestock and poultry can be found throughout the county, but is particularly prominent near the city of Petaluma. The raising of chickens (for eggs and as broilers), cattle, sheep, and to a lesser extent hogs comprised a $250,000,000 industry in 2019. 
 Fishing and Crabbing- Primarily concentrated on Bodega Bay, Sonoma County's fishing industry was worth just over $9,300,000 in 2019. Although numerous species are fished and farmed, the most prominent include Dungeness crab and Chinook salmon.
 Apples- Behind grapes, apples are the second most common crop grown in Sonoma County, particularly near the city of Sebastopol, and is an industry worth nearly $2,000,000. Although several varieties are grown, the region is most well known for its renowned Gravenstein apples. 
 Other crops- In addition to grapes and apples, Sonoma County is also home to farms producing olives, hay, rye, oats, and various vegetables (particularly tomatoes, carrots, green beans, and celery). There are also numerous nurseries producing flowers and other decorative ornamentals. 
 Timber Industry- Although not as prominent as it once was, Sonoma County does retain a timber industry, particularly along its western and northwestern coastlines. The most common trees that are logged are Redwoods, as well as various Pines and Oaks.

Similar to other Bay Area communities, Sonoma County is also home to several prominent players in the Tech Industry, such as Keysight (formerly a part of Agilent Technologies) in Santa Rosa. Sonoma County is home to several notable brewing and beverage companies including: Bear Republic Brewing Company, Guayakí, Lagunitas Brewing Company, and the Russian River Brewing Company. The clothing manufacturer Marmot is based in Rohnert Park.

Politics
For most of the 20th century, Sonoma County was a Republican stronghold in presidential elections. From 1880 until 1988, the only Democrats to carry Sonoma were Winfield Scott Hancock in 1880, Grover Cleveland in 1888 and 1892, Woodrow Wilson in 1912, Franklin D. Roosevelt in 1932 and 1936, and Lyndon B. Johnson in 1964. Like the rest of the Bay Area, it has since become a Democratic stronghold.

The last Republican to win a majority in the county was Ronald Reagan in 1984, and the last Republican to represent a significant part of the county in Congress was Representative Donald H. Clausen, who left office in January 1983.

On November 4, 2008, Sonoma County voted 66.4% against Proposition 8 which amended the California Constitution to ban same-sex marriages.

According to the California Secretary of State, as of February 2019, there are 277,665 registered voters in Sonoma County. Of those, 143,054 (51.5%) are registered Democratic, 49,386 (17.8%) are registered Republican, and 70,244 (25.3%) declined to state a political party. Every city, town, and the unincorporated areas of Sonoma County have more registered Democrats than Republicans.

Voter registration statistics

Cities by population and voter registration

Education

Higher education
Empire College, Santa Rosa
Golden Gate University (Rohnert Park satellite of Walnut Creek Campus)
Santa Rosa Junior College
Sonoma State University, Rohnert Park
University of San Francisco (Santa Rosa Campus)

K-12 schools

The educational system of Sonoma County is similar to that of other counties in California, with a large number of independent school districts.

School districts include:

Unified:

 Calistoga Joint Unified School District
 Cloverdale Unified School District
 Cotati-Rohnert Park Unified School District
 Geyserville Unified School District
 Healdsburg Unified School District - Includes areas zoned for PK-12 and areas zoned only for 7-12
 Shoreline Unified School District
 Sonoma Valley Unified School District
 Windsor Unified School District

Secondary:

 Petaluma Joint Union High School District
 Point Arena Joint Union High School District
 Santa Rosa City School District
 West Sonoma County Union High School District

Elementary:

 Alexander Valley Union School District
 Bellevue Union School District
 Bennett Valley Union Elementary School District
 Cinnabar Elementary School District
 Dunham Elementary School District
 Forestville Union Elementary School District
 Fort Ross Elementary School District
 Gravenstein Union Elementary School District
 Guerneville Elementary School District
 Harmony Union School District
 Horicon Elementary School District
 Kashia Elementary School District
 Kenwood Elementary School District
 Laguna Joint Elementary School District
 Liberty Elementary School District
 Mark West Union Elementary School District
 Monte Rio Union Elementary School District
 Montgomery Elementary School District
 Oak Grove Union Elementary School District
 Old Adobe Union Elementary School District
 Petaluma City Elementary School District
 Piner-Olivet Union Elementary School District
 Rincon Valley Union Elementary School District
 Roseland Public Schools
 Santa Rosa Elementary School District
 Sebastopol Union Elementary School District
 Twin Hills Union Elementary School District
 Two Rock Union Elementary School District
 Waugh Elementary School District
 West Side Union Elementary School District
 Wilmar Union Elementary School District
 Wright Elementary School District

Library system
The Sonoma County Library system offers a central library in downtown Santa Rosa plus 10 branch libraries and two rural stations. More than half of Sonoma County's residents have library cards and borrow more than 2.5 million items per year. The library's website and catalog]receive over 200,000 visits annually. Staff answer nearly half a million reference questions annually for individuals, businesses and government agencies. During a typical school year over 750 classes, more than half the county total, either visit a library or are visited by a children's librarian. The library operates an adult literacy program, and computer terminals are made available for free Internet access.

Museums

 The Pacific Coast Air Museum is on the southeast corner of the Charles M. Schulz Sonoma County Airport, next to the airplane hangar used in the 1963 Hollywood movie It's a Mad, Mad, Mad, Mad World.
 Charles M. Schulz Museum, Santa Rosa
 Sonoma County Museum, Santa Rosa
 Luther Burbank Home and Gardens, Santa Rosa
 Healdsburg Museum & Historical Society, Healdsburg
 Hand Fan Museum of Healdsburg, Healdsburg
 Petaluma Historical Library and Museum, Petaluma
 Petaluma Wildlife & Natural Science Museum, Petaluma
 Military Antiques & Museum, Petaluma
 Sonoma Valley Museum of Art, Sonoma
 Depot Park Museum, Sonoma
 West County Museum, Sebastopol
 Cloverdale History Museum (aka The Gould-Shaw House Museum), Cloverdale
 California Indian Museum and Cultural Center, Santa Rosa
 Cotati Museum, Cotati

Places of interest

Hood Mountain Regional Park
Safari West
 Sonoma Raceway 
 Sonoma Coast State Beach, including Arched Rock Beach, Gleason Beach and Goat Rock Beach.
Spring Lake Regional Park
Sugarloaf Ridge State Park
 Bodega Bay
Doran Regional Park
 Fort Ross, former Russian fur trade outpost
 Luther Burbank Center for the Arts
 Luther Burbank Home and Gardens
 Luther Burbank Gold Ridge Experiment Farm
 Quarryhill Botanic Garden
 Lake Sonoma
 Tolay Lake Regional Park
 Jack London State Historic Park, author Jack London's Beauty Ranch, in Glen Ellen
 Rancho Petaluma Adobe
 Mission San Francisco Solano, across from Sonoma Plaza
 Armstrong Redwoods State Reserve
 Stillwater Cove
 Sonoma TrainTown Railroad

Populated places

Incorporated
Sonoma County has nine incorporated municipalities.

Unincorporated
The county also includes the following populated places which are not incorporated:

Census-designated places

Bloomfield
Bodega
Bodega Bay
Boyes Hot Springs
Carmet
Cazadero
El Verano
Eldridge
Fetters Hot Springs-Agua Caliente
Forestville
Fulton
Geyserville
Glen Ellen
Graton
Guerneville
Jenner
Kenwood
Larkfield-Wikiup
Monte Rio
Occidental
Penngrove
Roseland
Salmon Creek
Sea Ranch
Sereno del Mar
Sonoma State University
Temelec
Timber Cove
Valley Ford

Other unincorporated places

Annapolis
Asti
Bodega Harbor
Bridgehaven
Buena Vista
Cadwell
Camp Meeker
Carneros
Cozzens Corners
Cunningham
Diamond A Ranch
Duncans Mills
El Bonita
Forest Hills
Freestone
The Geysers
Guernewood Park
Hacienda
Hessel
Hilton
Hollydale
Jimtown
Kellogg
Knowles Corner
Korbel
Lakeville
Lytton
Mark West
Mark West Springs
Mercuryville
Mesa Grande
Mirabel Heights
Mirabel Park
Mission Highlands
Monte Cristo
Montesano
Noel Heights
Northwood
Oakmont
Odd Fellows Park
Rancho Abajo
Rio Dell
Rio Nido
Rolands
Russian River Terrace
Schellville
Soda Springs
Stewarts Point
Summerhome Park
Two Rock
Vacation Beach
Venado
Villa Grande
Vineburg

Former townships

At the time of its formation, the county comprised four civil townships. It was restructured several times, and by 1880 was made up of 14 townships:

 Analy
 Bodega
 Cloverdale
 Knight's Valley
 Mendocino
 Ocean
 Petaluma
 Redwood
 Russian River
 Salt Point
 Santa Rosa
 Sonoma
 Vallejo
 Washington

Population ranking

The population ranking of the following table is based on the 2010 census of Sonoma County.

† county seat

In popular culture

Film

Due to the varied scenery in Sonoma County and proximity to the city of San Francisco, a large number of movies have been filmed using venues within the county. Some of the earliest U.S. filmmaking occurred in Sonoma County, including Salomy Jane (1914) and one of Broncho Billy Anderson's 1915 Westerns.

Other films include the 1947 film The Farmer's Daughter (starring Joseph Cotten and Loretta Young) as well as two Alfred Hitchcock films, Shadow of a Doubt of 1943, filmed and set in Santa Rosa, and The Birds of 1963, filmed largely in Bodega Bay and Bodega. American Graffiti was filmed largely in Petaluma.

Other films produced partially in Sonoma County include:

Other
Bliss, the default computer wallpaper of Microsoft's Windows XP operating system, is a photograph of a green hill and blue sky with clouds in Sonoma County. Taken in 1996 by Charles O'Rear, it is the most viewed photo in the world.

See also

 List of Sonoma County Regional Parks facilities
 National Register of Historic Places listings in Sonoma County, California
 Sonoma County Historic Landmarks and Districts
 Sonoma County Water Agency
 Sonoma Mountain Zen Center

Notes

References

Further reading
 
 
 
 
 
 
 

 

 
 , Volume one, Volume two

External links

 
 Sonoma.com
 Sonoma Economic Development Board
 
 Parks and Recreation in Sonoma County
 Sonoma County Historical Society
 North Bay Regional Collection at Sonoma State University Library

 
1850 establishments in California
Populated places established in 1850
California wine
Counties in the San Francisco Bay Area
California counties